Roger de Piles's L'Abrégé de la vie des peintres...avec un traité du peintre parfait (The Art of Painting and the Lives of the Painters), was a major art biography of painters. It was written by the French spy Roger de Piles. In 1692, during the War of the League of Augsburg, he was arrested in the Hague carrying a false passport and imprisoned for the next five years, where he wote his L'Abrégé in 7 parts; 1) Sketch of the perfect painter, 2) Greek painters; 3) Painters from Rome & Florence; 4) Painters from Venice; 5) Painters from Lombardy; 6) Painters from Germany and the Low Countries; 7) Painters from France and ending with his famous "Balance of painters". The book was finally published in 1699 following his appointment as Conseiller Honoraire to the Académie de peinture et de sculpture in Paris.

Part 6 includes in order of appearance in the text, the following list of Artists from Germany and the Low Countries:
Hubert van Eyck (1366–1426), p 334
Albrecht Dürer (1471–1528), p 336
Georg Pencz (1500–1550), p 342
Peter Candid (1548–1628), p 343
Cornelis Engebrechtsz. (1468–1533), p 343
Bernard van Orley (1490–1541), p 344
Michiel Coxie (1499–1592), p 345
Lucas van Leyden (1494–1533), p 345
Quentin Matsys (1466–1530), p 347
Jan van Calcar (1499–1546), p 349
Pieter Coecke van Aelst (1502–1550), p 350
Heinrich Aldegrever (1502–1555), p 351
Jan Mabuse (1478–1532), p 352
Jan van Scorel (1495–1562), p 354
Lambert Lombard (1505–1566), p 355
Hans Holbein the Younger (1497–1543), p 356
Tobias Stimmer (1539–1584), p 360
Jan Cornelisz Vermeyen (1500–1559), p 360
Antonis Mor (1520–1576), p 361
Pieter Bruegel the Elder (1526–1569), p 362
Frans Floris (1519–1570), p 363
Christoph Schwarz (1545–1592), p 364
Willem Key (1515–1568), p 365
Hubert Goltzius (1534–1609), p 365
Pieter Pourbus (1523–1584), p 366
Dirck Barendsz (1534–1592), p 366
Hans Bol (1534–1593), p 367
Maarten van Heemskerck (1498–1574), p 367
Karel van Mander (1548–1606), p 369
Marten de Vos (1532–1603), p 370
Stradanus (1523–1605), p 371
Bartholomeus Spranger (1546–1611), p 372
Hendrik Goltzius (1558–1617), p 374
Hans von Aachen (1552–1614), p 376
Joseph Heintz the Elder (1564–1609), p 377
Paul Bril (1554–1626), p 377
Cornelis van Haarlem (1562–1637), p 378
Adam van Noort (1561–1641), p 378
Otto van Veen (1556–1629), p 379
Hans Rottenhammer (1564–1625), p 381
Pieter Cornelisz van Rijck (1567–1637), p 382
Peter Paul Rubens (1577–1640), p 382
Adam Elsheimer (1578–1610), p 396
Abraham Bloemaert (1564–1651), p 397
Hendrik van Steenwijk I (1550–1603), p 398
Abraham Janssens (1570–1632), p 399
Gerard Seghers (1591–1651), p 400
Michiel Jansz. van Mierevelt (1567–1641), p 401
Cornelis Schut (1597–1655), p 401
Gerard van Honthorst (1592–1656), p 402
Anthony van Dyck (1599–1641), p 403
Adriaen Brouwer (1605–1638), p 408
Cornelius van Poelenburgh (1595–1667), p 409
Roelant Savery (1576–1639), p 410
Johannes van der Beeck (1589–1644), p 410
Friedrich Brentel (1580–1651), p 411
Johann Wilhelm Baur (1607–1639), p 411
Hendrick Goudt (1583–1648), p 412
David Teniers the Elder (1582–1649), p 413
Jan van den Hoecke (1611–1651), p 414
Jacques Fouquier (1590–1659), p 414
Pieter van Laer (1592–1642), p 415
Andries Both (1612–1642), p 416
Daniel Seghers (1590–1661), p 417
Balthazar Gerbier (1591–1663), p 418
Herman van Swanevelt (1604–1655), p 418
George Geldorp (1590–1665), p 419
Isaac Oliver (1565–1617), p 419
Peter Lely (1618–1680), p 419
Cornelis de Heem (1631–1695), p 420
Abraham van Diepenbeeck (1596–1675), p 420
David Teniers the Younger (1610–1690), p 420
Rembrandt (1606–1669), p 421
Gerrit Dou (1613–1675), p 428
Frans van Mieris the Elder (1635–1681), p 430
Adriaen Hanneman (1603–1671), p 431 (Note: in the Dutch translation of 1725, the title of this entry was mistakenly translated as "Lange Jan", referring to Jan Gerritsz van Bronckhorst (1603–1661) instead of Hanneman)
Jacob Jordaens (1593–1678), p 432
Erasmus Quellinus II (1607–1678), p 433
Joachim von Sandrart (1606–1688), p 434
Hendrik Verschuring (1627–1690), p 437
Caspar Netscher (1639–1684), p 441

External links
 Online version (English) of 1706 The Art of Painting, and the Lives of Painters: Containing, a Compleat Treatise of Painting, Designing, and the Use of Prints by Roger de Piles, published by J. Nutt, on Google Books 
 Online version (French) of 1715 Abregé de la Vie des peintres by Roger de Piles on Google Books 
 Version (Dutch) of 1725 translated by Johannes Verhoek "Beknopt verhaal van het Leven der Vermaardste Schilders" by Roger de Piles on archive.org
1699 books
French art historians
14th-century German painters
15th-century German painters
16th-century German painters
17th-century German painters
Dutch Golden Age painters
Art history books
Compilations of biographies about artists